The Humanitarian Overseas Service Medal is an award in the Australian honours system. The award is presented to those who perform humanitarian service in a foreign country, in particular those working in dangerous environments or conditions or during a humanitarian crisis. The award was introduced by letters patent on 16 April 1999, following a review of the Australian honours and awards system beginning in 1995.

Potential recipients have to prove they worked for a minimum of 30 days in the location depicted by the clasp, during a period of time set in the award criteria. In addition, potential recipients have to be working for an aid organisation recognised by the criteria or with a United Nations taskforce during that timeframe. In 2005, special criteria were established for people working during the 2004 Indian Ocean earthquake or the 2005 Nias–Simeulue earthquake, with a maximum time period of 7 or 14 days depending on the time frame.

The medal was originally intended as a civilian award, in parallel with the Australian Service Medal and the Police Overseas Service Medal, and until 2005 the Australian Defence Force had never been declared an eligible organisation.  This is because, in most cases, the Australian Service Medal is already available to military personnel serving alongside humanitarian relief operations. However, defence personnel on leave of absence and serving an eligible organisation could qualify for the medal.  The declaration of eligible organisations for the Indian Ocean clasp was the first time the Australian Defence Force was declared an eligible organisation, as Operation Sumatra Assist was purely a disaster relief operation and did not attract any military operational service award.  The Australian Defence Force was again declared an eligible organisation for the participation of its personnel in Operation Pakistan Assist, part of the Australian humanitarian response to 8 October 2005 Pakistan earthquake.

Description
 The Humanitarian Overseas Service Medal is a circular medal. The obverse features a stylised eucalyptus tree in the centre, with its branches reaching to the edge of the medal. A pattern of gumnuts rings the eucalyptus.
 The reverse has the same pattern of gumnuts around the rim, with the name of the recipient engraved.
 The ribbon is eucalyptus green, divided vertically by a gold stripe. These colours are associative with the green and gold, the national colours of Australia, while continuing with the eucalyptus theming; symbolising hope and regeneration after the disaster.

Clasps
Nineteen clasps have been declared for the Humanitarian Overseas Service Medal as of May 2010, to indicate what region(s) the recipient worked in. These are detailed below:
 Afghanistan
 30 days service with civilian organisations in Afghanistan from 8 December 1979 to present
 Balkans
 30 days civilian service in the period;
 Zone 1 – Bosnia and Herzegovina, Croatia, Montenegro and Serbia – from 21 February 1992 to present
 Zone 2 – Serbia, Kosovo, Albania, Republic of Macedonia – from 24 March 1999 to present
 British Columbia
 14 days service in Canada with civilian organisations from 3 August 2009 to 6 September 2009. Following wildfires in British Columbia, Canada
 British Columbia II
 14 days service in Canada with civilian organisations from  August 2017 to September 2017. Following wildfires in British Columbia, Canada
 Cambodia
 30 days service in Cambodia with civilian organisations from 1 July 1979 to 31 December 1993
 Christchurch
 14 days service with civilian rescue agencies or State and Territory police agencies from 22 February 2011 to 26 May 2011 following the 2011 Christchurch earthquake in New Zealand
 East Timor
 30 days service with civilian organisations in East Timor from 1 June 1999 to 19 May 2002
 Great Lakes
 30 days service with civilian organisations in the African Great Lakes area from 1 May 1994 to Present
 Haiti
 14 days service with civilian organisations in Haiti from 12 January 2010 to 15 March 2010. Following a Hurricane
 Indian Ocean
 Civilian, Police and Military service providing assistance following the 2004 Indian Ocean earthquake
 7 days service in the period 26 December 2004 – 8 January 2005
 14 days service in the period 26 December 2004 – 12 February 2005
 Civilian and Military service providing assistance following the 2005 Nias–Simeulue earthquake
 7 days service in the period 28 March 2005 – 18 April 2005
 Iraq
 30 days service with civilian organisations in Iraq from 20 March 2003 to Present
 Japan
 14 days service with civilian and rescue agencies from 11 March 2011 to 27 May 2011 following the 2011 Tōhoku earthquake and tsunami
 Mozambique
 30 days service with civilian organisations in Mozambique from 10 October 1985 to 31 January 1995
 Northern Iraq
 30 days service with civilian organisations in Northern Iraq from 1 February 1991 to 31 May 1995
 Pakistan
 Civilian and Military assistance following the 2005 Pakistan earthquake
 14 days service in the period 8 October 2005 – 8 November 2005
 30 days service in the period 8 October 2005 – 31 May 2006
 Pakistan II
 14 days service with civilian and military agencies from 6 August 2010 to 8 November 2010 following the 2010 Pakistan flood
 Samoa
 7 days service with civilian, police and rescue agencies from 29 September 2009 to 10 October 2009 following the 2009 Samoa earthquake and tsunami
 Somalia
 30 days service with civilian organisations in Somalia from 1 March 1992 to 1 January 1996
 South Sudan
 30 days service with civilian organisations in Southern Sudan from 23 May 1992
 South Vietnam
 30 days service with civilian organisations South Vietnam from 29 May 1964 to 30 April 1975
 Ukraine
 Australian Government response to the downing of Malaysia Airlines Flight 17 on 17 July 2014.  
 7 days service at crash site (Zone 1) and in conflict zone (Zone 2) Ukraine;
 14 days service in conflict zone (Zone 2) Ukraine; or
 14 days deployed to Disaster Victim Identification (DVI) operation (Zone 3) in The Netherlands.
 Vanuatu

Recipients
As of 30 June 2010, 1,993 awards, including medals and additional clasps, had been made.

Notable recipients of this award include:
 Father Frank Brennan SJ, AO, clasp awarded in 2002, for his work as Director of the Jesuit Refugee Service in East Timor
 Andrew MacLeod
 military personnel involved in Operation Sumatra Assist I and II who meet the eligibility criteria
 the eleven ADF personnel involved in the 2005 Nias Island WS-61 Sea King crash, including the nine who died

Declared eligible organisations must be part of an Australian humanitarian response, or an Australian contingent to an international response.  Accordingly, it is possible for non-Australians participating in such a group to be eligible for the medal.

See also
Australian Honours Order of Precedence

References

 
 ADF Honours and Awards
 
 British Columbia & Haiti
 Humanitarian Overseas Service Medal (Ukraine) Declaration 2015

Civil awards and decorations of Australia
Military awards and decorations of Australia
Humanitarian and service awards
1999 establishments in Australia
Awards established in 1999